Karl Weber may refer to:

Karl Weber (politician, born 1898) (1898–1985), German politician (CDU), West Germany's Minister of Justice from April to October 1965
Karl Weber (politician, born 1936), German politician (CDU)
Karl-Heinz Weber (1922–1944), German World War II flying ace
Karl Ivanovich Weber (1841–1910), Russian diplomat
Karl Jakob Weber (1712–1764), Swiss architect and engineer; led first organized excavations at Herculaneum, Pompeii and Stabiae
Karl Julius Weber (1767–1832), German writer and satirist
Karl Weber (actor) (1918–1990), actor in long-running American soap opera Guiding Light
Karl Weber (racing driver) (born 1996), American racing driver and author
Karl Otto Weber (1827–1867), German surgeon and pathologist
Karl Weber (art director) (1897–1965), German art director
Karl Weber, mayor of Hadres, Hollabrunn, Lower Austria, Austria

See also
Carl Weber (disambiguation)